Cameraria saccharella is a moth of the family Gracillariidae. It is known from Ontario and Quebec in Canada, and Illinois, New Jersey, Ohio, Maine, New York, Connecticut and Vermont in the United States.

The wingspan is 5–7 mm.

The larvae feed on Acer species, including Acer nigrum, Acer rubrum, Acer saccharinum and Acer saccharum. They mine the leaves of their host plant. The mine has the form of a small irregular blotch mine on the upperside of the leaf. There may be up to thirty mines on a single leaf. The pupa is not enclosed in a cocoon.

References

External links
Cameraria at microleps.org
mothphotographersgroup

Cameraria (moth)
Moths of North America
Lepidoptera of Canada
Lepidoptera of the United States
Leaf miners
Moths described in 1908
Taxa named by Annette Frances Braun